Hannelore Eva Kreisky, née Zgraja (born 8 September 1944 in Vienna) is an Austrian political scientist and jurist.

Biography

She earned a doctorate in law at the University of Vienna in 1971, and studied political science at the Institut für Höhere Studien in Vienna, where she worked from 1972. She became head of department for the Department of Political Science in 1979, and earned her Habilitation in 1986–87. From 1989 to 1993, she was Professor of political science, in particular women's studies, at the Free University of Berlin. She was Visiting Professor of Gender Studies at the University of Vienna from 1993, and became Professor there in 1995. She became a member of the council of the University of Innsbruck in 2007.

Kreisky is known for her research on state theory, theory of bureaucracy, feminism, political theory and the history of ideas.

She was married to the late political scientist Peter Kreisky, and the daughter-in-law of former Chancellor Bruno Kreisky.

Awards 
 1999 Gabriele Possanner State Prize

Publications
 Feministische Standpunkte in der Politikwissenschaft : eine Einführung, 1995
 Vom patriarchalen Staatssozialismus zur patriarchalen Demokratie, 1996
 Das geheime Glossar der Politikwissenschaft : geschlechtskritische Inspektion der Kategorien einer Disziplin, 1997
 Geschlechterverhältnisse im Kontext politischer Transformation, 1998
 Geschlecht und Eigensinn : feministische Recherchen in der Politikwissenschaft, 1998
 Arena der Männlichkeit : über das Verhältnis von Fussball und Geschlecht, 2006
 Theoriearbeit in der Politikwissenschaft, 2011
 Dauerkämpfe Feministische Zeitdiagnosen und Strategien, 2017
 Jüdische Identitäten und antisemitische Politiken im österreichischen Parlament 1861-1933, 2017

References

External links 
 
 
 Kreisky page at OCLC

1944 births
Living people
Austrian political scientists
Austrian women writers
Women political scientists